This is a list of main career statistics of Russian professional tennis player Andrey Rublev. All statistics are according to the ATP World Tour and ITF websites.

Performance timelines

Singles
Current through the 2023 Qatar ExxonMobil Open.

Doubles 
Current after the 2022 Madrid Open.

Significant finals

Olympic finals

Mixed doubles: 1 (1 Gold medal)

ATP Masters 1000

Singles: 2 (2 runner-ups)

Doubles: 3 (3 runner-ups)

ATP career finals

Singles: 18 (12 titles, 6 runner-ups)

Doubles: 6 (3 titles, 3 runner-ups)

ATP Next Generation finals

Singles: 1 (1 runner-up)

ATP Challenger & ITF Future finals

Singles: 10 (5–5)

Doubles: 5 (3–2)

ITF Junior Circuit

Junior Grand Slam finals

Singles: 1 (1 title)

Doubles: 1 (1 runner-up)

Youth Olympic medal matches

Singles: 1 (1 bronze medal)

Doubles: 1 (1 silver medal)

National and international participation

Team competitions finals: 2 (2 titles)

Davis Cup (20–10)

   indicates the outcome of the Davis Cup match followed by the score, date, place of event, the zonal classification and its phase, and the court surface.

ATP Cup (4–1)

Laver Cup (3–0)

Record against other players

Record against top-10 players

Rublev's record against those who have been ranked in the top 10, with active players in boldface. 

|-bgcolor=efefef class="sortbottom"
|align=left|Number 1 ranked players||colspan=9|

|-bgcolor=efefef class="sortbottom"
|align=left|Number 2 ranked players||colspan=9|

|-bgcolor=efefef class="sortbottom"
|align=left|Number 3 ranked players||colspan=9|

|-bgcolor=efefef class="sortbottom"
|align=left|Number 4 ranked players||colspan=9|

|-bgcolor=efefef class="sortbottom"
|align=left|Number 5 ranked players||colspan=9|

|-bgcolor=efefef class="sortbottom"
|align=left|Number 6 ranked players||colspan=9|

|-bgcolor=efefef class="sortbottom"
|align=left|Number 7 ranked players||colspan=9|

|-bgcolor=efefef class="sortbottom"
|align=left|Number 8 ranked players||colspan=9|

|-bgcolor=efefef class="sortbottom"
|align=left|Number 9 ranked players||colspan=9|

|-bgcolor=efefef class="sortbottom"
|align=left|Number 10 ranked players||colspan=9|

Wins over top 10 players
He has a  record against players who were, at the time the match was played, ranked in the top 10.

*

Grand Slam seedings

*

ATP Tour career earnings

* Statistics correct .

Exhibitions

Tournament finals

Singles (2 titles, 2 runner-up)

References

Notes

External links
 
 
 

Rublev, Andrey